was a 2012 rhythm game created by Sega and Crypton Future Media for the iOS operating systems iPhone, iPad and iPod Touch. The game was a sequel to Miku Flick, released earlier that year, and a spin off of the Hatsune Miku: Project DIVA series of Vocaloid rhythm games. Like the original, the game primarily makes use of Vocaloids, a series of singing synthesizer software, and the songs created using these vocaloids, most notably the virtual-diva Vocaloid Hatsune Miku. The game was released internationally on August 10, 2012, making it the second Project Diva game to be released in English.

Support for the game ended on July 19, 2016.

Gameplay

The game retained the primary gameplay of its predecessor, whereby the game had 10 tiles, arranged in a 3x3 grid with the middle column having a 4th tile at the bottom. Each of these tiles had a hiragana Lyric on them; when indicated, the player is required to flick the tile in the indicated direction. The lyrics for each song were given above the tiles, and flowed from right to left with a circle on the left. When the indicated lyric reaches the circle, the player had to tap the lyric tile and flick it in the indicated direction. Like the original game, PVs were pre-rendered with graphics of Project DIVA Arcade. The game also retained the "PV Mode" where players can watch the PVs of the various songs.

Unlike its predecessor, the game featured vocaloids other than Hatsune Miku, including Kagamine Rin, Kagamine Len and Megurine Luka as well as duet songs whereby two vocaloids would sing together for a song. The game also included a new "Extreme" difficulty mode, which provided players with a difficulty between that of the "Hard" and "Break the Limit" modes, retained from the original. The game also provided additional Downloadable Content via the In-App Purchases system that would include new songs and seasonal costumes. The additional "Replay Mode" was later added, allowing players to save a replay of their performance and share it with friends.

Song List
The game had a total of 74 songs. The official site featured list (deemed Initial Song Compilation) of nine songs, as well as one hidden one. Unlike the first game, the game also featured new songs post-launch via downloadable content.

Songs with a white background are part of the initial song pack that comes with the game at purchase
Songs with a green background were added to the song list after an update.
Songs with an orange background are DLC and must be purchased via In-App Purchasing

References

External links
Official Site

2012 video games
Music video games
IOS games
IOS-only games
Sega video games
Creative works using vocaloids
Hatsune Miku: Project DIVA games
Video games developed in Japan